Bob Hoffman (born July 18, 1957) is an American college basketball coach who is currently the head coach at the University of Central Oklahoma.

Early life
He is a graduate of Putnam City High School in Warr Acres, Oklahoma and went to Oklahoma Baptist University in Shawnee to play basketball. He met his wife there and after graduation he was hired at Piedmont High School in Piedmont, Oklahoma just northwest of Oklahoma City.

Coaching career
He was then hired as the head women's basketball coach at Southern Nazarene University, where his team won the NAIA national championship in 1989. From there he returned to his alma mater as men's coach for the following ten years.

From OBU he was the coach at University of Texas-Pan American then back to Oklahoma where he served as an assistant to Kelvin Sampson at the University of Oklahoma until Sampson was found to have committed numerous NCAA violations. After an investigation of the entire coaching staff, Hoffman was cleared by the NCAA of any wrongdoing, and parted ways with the program. Prior to his role at Mercer University, Hoffman went on to coach in the American Basketball League and the NBA Development League. He was hired on March 27, 2008 to replace Mark Slonaker. He led Mercer to the 2012 CollegeInsider.com Tournament championship as well as the University's first NCAA Tournament victory in an upset of No. 6 Duke on March 21, 2014.

Hoffman won his 400th game as a men's college coach when Mercer defeated Lipscomb University on January 26, 2013. With the victory, Hoffman was 488–239 as a men's and women's college coach. In addition, he previously served as head coach of the Arkansas Aeros in the American Basketball Association and of the Rio Grande Valley Vipers in the NBA Development League Hoffman was the first coach in NCAA Division I Men's basketball history to post a victory in each of the collegiate post season basketball tournaments.  He later coached at Mercer University in Macon, Georgia from 2008 to 2019.

Hoffman ended his tenure at Mercer with a record of 209–165 (.572).

Head coaching record

Women's

Men's

Personal life
Hoffman is a Christian. Hoffman and Mercer President William D. Underwood are both graduates of Oklahoma Baptist University.

See also
Hawkins Arena
Mercer Bears

References

Living people
1957 births
American men's basketball coaches
American men's basketball players
Basketball coaches from Oklahoma
Basketball players from Oklahoma
Central Oklahoma Bronchos men's basketball coaches
Mercer Bears men's basketball coaches
Oklahoma Baptist Bison basketball coaches
Oklahoma Baptist Bison basketball players
Oklahoma Sooners men's basketball coaches
Southern Nazarene Crimson Storm women's basketball coaches
Southern Nazarene University faculty
Sportspeople from Oklahoma City
UT Rio Grande Valley Vaqueros men's basketball coaches
Forwards (basketball)
Guards (basketball)